John Nusum is a retired Bermudan football defender who spent two seasons in the North American Soccer League and at least one in the Major Indoor Soccer League.   He was also a 1974 and 1975 first team All American and played an unknown number of games with the Bermuda national football team, as did his brother Sam Nusum.

Youth
Nusum attended Philadelphia College of Textiles & Science where he played on the men's soccer team from 1974 to 1977.  He was a 1974 and 1975 first team All American.

Professional
In 1978, Nusum signed with the San Diego Sockers of the North American Soccer League.  He played only one season with the Sockers before moving to the New York Arrows of the Major Indoor Soccer League in the fall of 1978.  The Arrows won the 1978-1979 MISL championship.  He was back in the NASL in 1980 with the Rochester Lancers, but saw time in only four games.

National team
Nusum played an unknown number of games for the Bermuda national football team.  Later, his son John Barry Nusum also appeared for the national team.

References

External links
 NASL Stats

1954 births
Living people
Bermudian footballers
Bermudian expatriate footballers
Bermuda international footballers
Hartford Hellions players
Major Indoor Soccer League (1978–1992) players
New Jersey Rockets (MISL) players
New York Arrows players
North American Soccer League (1968–1984) players
Philadelphia Rams soccer players
Rochester Lancers (1967–1980) players
San Diego Sockers (NASL) players
Expatriate soccer players in the United States
Bermudian expatriate sportspeople in the United States
People from Paget Parish
All-American men's college soccer players
Association football defenders